The British Christmas Tree Growers Association is the trade association for those who grow specialist Christmas Trees in Great Britain and Northern Ireland. Membership is open to those who intend to grow or are growing trees for the Christmas market. Associate membership is available for those who provide goods and services to the Christmas Tree sector.

Members of the BCTGA cultivate trees specially for the Christmas festivities.

Annual Competition
The BCTGA holds an annual competition to find the best grower from their membership. Entries to the competition are divided into four categories; Pine, Fir, Spruce and Wreath. All trees must be between 1.8m and 2.2m in height. Each entrant is allowed up to two entries in any given category and the judges look for foliage, shape and marketability.

The competition awards a prize for 'Grower of the Year' and the winner is afforded the honour of providing their tree to be the Downing Street Christmas tree that year. The winner of the best wreath category also provides a wreath to be hung on the famous black door.

See also
American Christmas Tree Association
Christmas tree cultivation
National Christmas Tree Association
Downing Street Christmas Tree

External links
 The British Christmas Tree Growers Association homepage
 The christmastree.org.uk website by BCTGA
 Retail members of BCTGA
 Wholesale members of BCTGA

Agricultural organisations based in the United Kingdom
Christmas tree production
Christmas in the United Kingdom
Christmas organizations